Richard Chang may refer to:
Richard Sui On Chang (1941–2017), American Roman Catholic bishop
Richard Chang Ru-gin (born 1948), Chinese businessman, founder of Semiconductor Manufacturing International Corporation
Richard Chang (Costco) (born 1967), Taiwanese American basketball player and Costco executive
Richard Chang Hung-pen, co-founder of ASE Group